Bhujpur Thana is a newly established Thana in Chittagong District.
This Thana is inaugurated by Inspector General of Bangladesh Police Mr. Noor Mohammad on 21 July'2007

References 
 lcgbangladesh
 dip.gov

Thanas of Chittagong District